Pedro Augusto Rizzo (born 3 May 1974) is a Brazilian retired mixed martial artist and kickboxer who competed for the UFC, PRIDE, M-1 Global, and Affliction. Although he never captured the UFC Heavyweight Championship, Rizzo competed for it three times and was regarded as a top contender for many years. Coming from a Muay Thai background, Rizzo competed in Vale Tudo before transitioning into mixed martial arts. Often regarded as one of the most dangerous strikers in heavyweight history, Rizzo holds notable victories over former UFC champions Mark Coleman, Dan Severn, Josh Barnett, Andrei Arlovski, Ricco Rodriguez and Ken Shamrock.

Mixed martial arts career 
Early in his career Rizzo adopted brutal leg kicks from his master trainer Marco Ruas and also from training at the Amsterdam-based Chakuriki gym. Pedro developed a strong stand-up style early on--and used this to great effect throughout his career. 

Rizzo is a former World Vale Tudo Championship (WVC) Heavyweight Champion and former contender for the UFC heavyweight belt. Rizzo was almost an unstoppable force in his early UFC run, which culminated in a highly controversial loss at the hands of Randy Couture. The UFC heavyweight title fight between these fighters took place in Atlantic city on 4 May 2001, and Rizzo dominated the pace of the fight and punished Couture with heavy leg kicks; which at the conclusion of the bout left Couture unable to exit the arena without assistance. After the judges read out the scores, even Couture's expression of disbelief assisted the public's reaction of a fight in which Rizzo was clearly robbed. Rizzo then had a chance to rematch Couture but was soundly beaten by Couture in this rematch, and after this fight Rizzo's performances were mixed. Rizzo never seemed to recover from the controversial loss to Couture in that first fight, and this is what is believed to have taken the wind out of Rizzo's sails; as his hunger and drive were never the same as a consequence.

A stint in PRIDE FC did not go too well for the former UFC Heavyweight title contender, and Rizzo suffered quick losses at the hands of Sergei Kharitonov and Roman Zentsov.

Rizzo returned to his winning ways on 9 March 2007, when he beat UFC veteran Justin Eilers by unanimous decision at the début show of Art of War Undisputed Arena Fighting Championship, which was held in Dallas, Texas.

He defeated Jeff Monson on 1 September 2007. This fight took place on the first pay-per-view event promoted by the Art of War Undisputed Arena Fighting Championship organization. Rizzo was defeated at Affliction: Banned by Josh Barnett, via knockout in round 2.

He was defeated by Gilbert Yvel at Ultimate Chaos: Lashley vs. Sapp via knockout in round 1. In his rematch with Jeff Monson, Rizzo won a decision at Bitetti Combat. He revealed in the post-fight interview that he had an elbow problem 10 days before the fight and that was why he could not push for the knockout that "the Brazilian fans deserved".

Rizzo also won his last two fights, against Gary Goodridge at Washington Combat and against eventual UFC Hall of Famer Ken Shamrock at Impact Fighting Championships in Australia.

He was expected to face former UFC Heavyweight Champion Tim Sylvia on 14 August at War on the Mainland but it was discovered that Sylvia broke his foot in his fight with Mariusz Pudzianowski.

Rizzo was expected to be the main event against Tim Sylvia at ProElite 2 in November, However he pulled out of the bout due to an injury.

On 21 June 2012, Rizzo faced former PRIDE Heavyweight Champion Fedor Emelianenko, at M-1 Global ring in St. Petersburg, Russia. Rizzo got caught by a right hand from Fedor that knocked him down; Fedor then proceeded with punches that left Rizzo motionless at 1:24 of the first round.

On 26 May 2013, Pedro faced Japanese heavyweight Satoshi Ishii at IGF: GENOME 26. He lost via unanimous decision.

On 12 September 2015, Pedro returned to face Andrew Flores at Face to Face 12. He won via leg kicks, forcing Flores to quit in between rounds, and Rizzo announced his retirement shortly after the fight.

Personal life 
Rizzo has a daughter.

Championships and accomplishments 
 Art of War Undisputed Arena Fighting Championship
 IFA Heavyweight Championship (1 Time)
 World Vale Tudo Championship
 WVC Superfight Championship (1 Time)
 WVC 2 Tournament Winner
 Wrestling Observer Newsletter
 Fight of the Year (2001)  vs. Randy Couture on 4 May

Mixed martial arts record 

|-
| Win
| align=center| 20–11
| Andrew Flores Smith
| TKO (leg kicks)
| Face to Face 12
| 
| align=center| 1
| align=center| 5:00
| Espirito Santo, Brazil
| 
|-
| Loss
| align=center| 19–11
| Satoshi Ishii
| Decision (unanimous)
| IGF: Genome 26
| 
| align=center| 3
| align=center| 5:00
| Tokyo, Japan
| 
|-
| Loss
| align=center| 19–10
| Fedor Emelianenko
| KO (punches)
| M-1 Global: Fedor vs. Rizzo
| 
| align=center| 1
| align=center| 1:24
| St. Petersburg, Russia
| 
|-
| Win
| align=center| 19–9
| Ken Shamrock
| TKO (leg kicks and punches)
| Impact FC 2
| 
| align=center| 1
| align=center| 3:33
| Sydney, Australia
| 
|-
| Win
| align=center| 18–9
| Gary Goodridge
| TKO (doctor stoppage)
| Washington Combat: Battle of the Legends
| 
| align=center| 2
| align=center| 5:00
| Washington D.C. United States
| 
|-
| Win
| align=center| 17–9
| Jeff Monson
| Decision (unanimous)
| Bitetti Combat MMA 4
| 
| align=center| 3
| align=center| 5:00
| Rio de Janeiro, Brazil
| 
|-
| Loss
| align=center| 16–9
| Gilbert Yvel
| KO (punches)
| Ultimate Chaos: Lashley vs. Sapp
| 
| align=center| 1
| align=center| 2:10
| Biloxi, Mississippi, United States
| 
|-
| Loss
| align=center| 16–8
| Josh Barnett
| KO (punch)
| Affliction: Banned
| 
| align=center| 2
| align=center| 1:44
| Anaheim, California, United States
| 
|-
| Win
| align=center| 16–7
| Jeff Monson
| TKO (punches)
| Art of War 3
| 
| align=center| 3
| align=center| 2:40
| Dallas, Texas, United States
| 
|-
| Win
| align=center| 15–7
| Justin Eilers
| Decision (unanimous)
| Art of War 1
| 
| align=center| 3
| align=center| 5:00
| Dallas, Texas, United States
| 
|-
| Loss
| align=center| 14–7
| Roman Zentsov
| KO (punch)
| PRIDE 31
| 
| align=center| 1
| align=center| 0:25
| Saitama, Japan
| 
|-
| Loss
| align=center| 14–6
| Sergei Kharitonov
| TKO (soccer kick and punches)
| PRIDE Critical Countdown 2005
| 
| align=center| 1
| align=center| 2:02
| Saitama, Japan
| 
|-
| Win
| align=center| 14–5
| Ricco Rodriguez
| Decision (unanimous)
| UFC 45
| 
| align=center| 3
| align=center| 5:00
| Uncasville, Connecticut, United States
| 
|-
| Win
| align=center| 13–5
| Tra Telligman
| TKO (doctor stoppage)
| UFC 43
| 
| align=center| 2
| align=center| 4:24
| Las Vegas, Nevada, United States
| 
|-
| Loss
| align=center| 12–5
| Vladimir Matyushenko
| Decision (unanimous)
| UFC 41
| 
| align=center| 3
| align=center| 5:00
| Atlantic City, New Jersey, United States
| 
|-
| Loss
| align=center| 12–4
| Gan McGee
| TKO (corner stoppage)
| UFC 39
| 
| align=center| 1
| align=center| 5:00
| Uncasville, Connecticut, United States
| 
|-
| Win
| align=center| 12–3
| Andrei Arlovski
| KO (punches)
| UFC 36
| 
| align=center| 3
| align=center| 1:45
| Las Vegas, Nevada, United States
| 
|-
| Loss
| align=center| 11–3
| Randy Couture
| TKO (punches)
| UFC 34
| 
| align=center| 3
| align=center| 1:38
| Las Vegas, Nevada, United States
| 
|-
| Loss
| align=center| 11–2
| Randy Couture
| Decision (Unanimous)
| UFC 31
| 
| align=center| 5
| align=center| 5:00
| Atlantic City, New Jersey, United States
| 
|-
| Win
| align=center| 11–1
| Josh Barnett
| KO (punch)
| UFC 30
| 
| align=center| 2
| align=center| 4:21
| Atlantic City, New Jersey, United States
| 
|-
| Win
| align=center| 10–1
| Dan Severn
| TKO (submission to punches)
| UFC 27
| 
| align=center| 1
| align=center| 1:33
| New Orleans, Louisiana, United States
| 
|-
| Loss
| align=center| 9–1
| Kevin Randleman
| Decision (unanimous)
| UFC 26
| 
| align=center| 5
| align=center| 5:00
| Cedar Rapids, Iowa, United States
| 
|-
| Win
| align=center| 9–0
| Tsuyoshi Kohsaka
| TKO (punches)
| UFC 23
| 
| align=center| 3
| align=center| 1:12
| Tokyo, Japan
| 
|-
| Win
| align=center| 8–0
| Tra Telligman
| KO (punch)
| UFC 20
| 
| align=center| 1
| align=center| 4:30
| Birmingham, Alabama, United States
| 
|-
| Win
| align=center| 7–0
| Mark Coleman
| Decision (split)
| UFC 18
| 
| align=center| 1
| align=center| 15:00
| Kenner, Louisiana, United States
| 
|-
| Win
| align=center| 6–0
| Tank Abbott
| KO (punch)
| UFC Brazil
| 
| align=center| 1
| align=center| 8:07
| Sao Paulo, Brazil
| 
|-
| Win
| align=center| 5–0
| Richard Heard
| TKO (submission to punches)
| World Vale Tudo Championship 3
| 
| align=center| 1
| align=center| 13:12
| Brazil
| 
|-
| Win
| align=center| 4–0
| Vernon White
| KO (soccer kick)
| World Vale Tudo Championship 2
| 
| align=center| 1
| align=center| 6:30
| Brazil
| 
|-
| Win
| align=center| 3–0
| Michael Tielrooy
| Submission (keylock)
| World Vale Tudo Championship 2
| 
| align=center| 1
| align=center| 0:18
| Brazil
| 
|-
| Win
| align=center| 2–0
| Nicholas Hill (as Niccolaus)
| TKO (submission to punches)
| World Vale Tudo Championship 2
| 
| align=center| 1
| align=center| 1:49
| Brazil
| 
|-
| Win
| align=center| 1–0
| Eric Labaille
| TKO (punches)
| IMA: Battle of Styles
| 
| align=center| 1
| align=center| 2:57
| Netherlands
|

Kickboxing record (incomplete) 

|-
|- bgcolor="#ffbbbb"
|
|align=center|Loss
| Lloyd van Dams
|Nikko T. Press Productions: Battle of the Best
| 's-Hertogenbosch, North Brabant
|TKO (Corner Stoppage)
|align=center|2
|align=center|
|align=center|
|-
! style=background:white colspan=9 |
|-
|- bgcolor="#CCFFCC"
|
|align=center|Win
| Rob van Esdonk
|Nikko T. Press Productions: Battle of the Best
| 's-Hertogenbosch, North Brabant
|TKO (Corner Stoppage)
|align=center|3
|align=center|
|align=center|
|-
! style=background:white colspan=9 |
|-
|- bgcolor="#CCFFCC"
|
|align=center|Win
| Orlando Breienburg
|Nikko T. Press Productions: Battle of the Best
| 's-Hertogenbosch, North Brabant
|Decision (Unanimous)
|align=center|3
|align=center|3:00
|align=center|
|-
! style=background:white colspan=9 |
|-
|- bgcolor="#ffbbbb"
|
|align=center|Loss
| Michael Thompson
|K-1 Hercules '95
| Nagoya, Aichi
|TKO (Doctor Stoppage)
|align=center|3
|align=center|1:19
|align=center|14-1
|-
|-
| colspan=9 | Legend:

See also 
 List of male mixed martial artists

References

External links 
 
 

 Interview (MMARingReport)

1974 births
Living people
Brazilian male kickboxers
Heavyweight kickboxers
Brazilian male mixed martial artists
Heavyweight mixed martial artists
Mixed martial artists utilizing catch wrestling
Mixed martial artists utilizing Luta Livre
Mixed martial artists utilizing Muay Thai
Mixed martial artists utilizing Brazilian jiu-jitsu
Brazilian Muay Thai practitioners
Brazilian catch wrestlers
Brazilian practitioners of Brazilian jiu-jitsu
People awarded a black belt in Brazilian jiu-jitsu
Sportspeople from Rio de Janeiro (city)
Brazilian people of Italian descent
Ultimate Fighting Championship male fighters